Walkenhorst is a surname. Notable people with the surname include:

Bob Walkenhorst, American singer, songwriter, musician, and painter
Kira Walkenhorst (born 1990), German beach volleyball player
Pia Walkenhorst (born 1993), German volleyball player